Nepia Fox-Matamua (born 5 September 1991) is a rugby union player from Auckland in New Zealand. He plays as a flanker, primarily at openside.

Fox-Matamua is the great-grandson of famous Māori rugby player George Nēpia. Nepia, who was inducted into the New Zealand Sports Hall of Fame, played both league and union and has been described as "New Zealand rugby's first superstar".

Early life
Born in Auckland, Fox-Matamua attended St Peter's College in the city, playing for the school's first fifteen in his senior years there. He then went on to play for the Auckland University's rugby team. In his youth, Fox-Matamua played Gaelic football with the Marist Rangers club, which is under the Auckland GAA. He played in midfield and at centre forward. He has also played rugby sevens.

Career

First stint with Auckland
Fox-Matamua joined  during the 2012 ITM Cup, as an injury replacement. He made his debut with a start against Manawatu, and scored a try in 59–16 victory.

Season with North Harbour
Following his experience playing with Auckland, Fox-Matamua moved to Championship side North Harbour for the 2013 ITM Cup. During his time with North Harbour, he also played with the amateur club Marist. Fox-Matamua made his debut for North Harbour against Wellington on 28 August 2013, and was substituted after 54 minutes in a 35–27 defeat. His next appearance came as a substitute against Otago, replacing Leigh Thompson on 53 minutes. Fox-Matamua made his final appearance for North Harbour in the side's last game of the competition, replacing Viliami Fihaki against Canterbury.

Return to Auckland
Fox-Matamua returned to Auckland in 2014, in the process rejoining his club University. He made a single appearance for the side in the 2014 ITM Cup, coming on as a substitute for Blake Gibson in the semi-final match against Taranaki. During his second stint with Auckland, Fox-Matamua won the Gallaher Shield with University.

Move to Connacht
It was announced in March 2015 that Fox-Matamua had signed a two-year contract with Irish provincial team Connacht, having been targeted by Connacht head coach Pat Lam. Lam had previously coached Auckland and the Blues and worked with Fox-Matamua at the former. Already at Connacht before Fox-Matamua were Jake Heenan, previously part of the Auckland academy with him, and Tom McCartney, a former teammate of his on the Auckland senior team and Fox-Matamua consulted with them prior to signing.

Fox-Matamua made his competitive debut for Connacht on 4 September 2015, starting against Newport Gwent Dragons in the 2015–16 Pro12 on the opening day of the season. He played the full 80 minutes and scored a try after a catch and drive from a lineout as Connacht won 29–23. Fox-Matamua started the following week against Glasgow Warriors, again playing the full match and scoring a try as part of a drive by the team.

References

External links
 EPCR Profile
 Pro12 Profile
 Ultimate Rugby Profile

1991 births
Living people
Auckland rugby union players
Connacht Rugby players
Expatriate rugby union players in Ireland
New Zealand rugby union players
North Harbour rugby union players
People educated at St Peter's College, Auckland
Rugby union flankers
Rugby union players from Auckland